Patrick Benjamin Howard (born 27 March 1992) is a South African rugby union player who is currently playing for Ealing Trailinfders in the RFU Championship. He previously played for Welsh United Rugby Championship side Dragons,  in the Currie Cup and Vodacom Cup,  in Super Rugby and Irish province Munster. His usual position is centre or winger.

Career

Youth

In 2005, at primary school level, Howard was selected to represent his local provincial side KwaZulu-Natal at the Under–13 Craven Week tournament. He also represented them at the Under-18 Craven Week competitions in both 2009 and 2010. In 2010, he also secured inclusion in a South African Under-18 High Performance squad that played matches against France, Namibia and England.

He was a key member of the  side that reached the semi-finals of the 2011 Under-19 Provincial Championship, starting in twelve of their thirteen matches and scoring seven tries, which included a hat-trick in their match against .

In 2012, Howard was named in the South Africa Under–20 side that participated in the 2012 IRB Junior World Championship on home soil. He started the first match of the competition at outside centre, but was on the losing side as they suffered a 19–23 defeat to Ireland. He came on as a substitute in their next pool match against Italy, scoring a try in injury time at the end of the match to help South Africa to a convincing 52–3 victory. He started their final match in the pool stages against England on the left wing and played the entire 80 minutes as his side achieved a 28–15 victory to qualify for the semi-finals. An untimely hamstring injury ruled Howard out of the remainder of the tournament, with his side going on to win the competition for the first time, beating New Zealand 22–16 in the final.

He returned to provincial action in August 2012, representing the s in the 2012 Under-21 Provincial Championship.

Western Province

During the 2012 Currie Cup Premier Division, Howard was included in the  squad.

Howard scored his first and second senior tries during the competition – both in their Round Five match against 2011 winners, Argentine side .

He didn't feature in the play-offs as Western Province won their 33rd Currie Cup title, beating the  19–16 in the final.

Munster

During the South African off-season, he joined Irish side Munster on a three-month contract as injury cover during the 2014–15 season. He made his debut for Munster by coming on as a late replacement during their 38–12 victory over Welsh side Newport Gwent Dragons in Round Eight of the Pro12 season. He made his first start for Munster in their next Pro12 match, a 21–20 victory over fellow Irish side Ulster. A week later, he made his debut in the 2014–15 European Rugby Champions Cup, playing the full 80 minutes in their home match against French outfit . He remained involved in first team action until the end of January, making a total of six appearances in the Pro12 competition and three in the European Rugby Champions Cup. His final match was Munster's final match in Pool 1 of the Champions Cup against Premiership side Sale Sharks. Despite only coming on during the second half of the match, he scored his first try in Munster colours to help them to a 65–10 victory. His short-term contract expired and he returned to South Africa in February 2015.

Northampton Saints

In April 2015, English Premiership side Northampton Saints announced that Howard would join them for the 2015–16 English Premiership season.

Dragons
Howard joined the Dragons for the 2016-17 season and he was released at the end of the 2017-18 season.

Ealing Trailfinders
On 9 March 2018, Packman returns to England to join the RFU Championship side Ealing Trailfinders ahead of the 2018-19 season.

References

External links
Munster Profile
Dragons profile

1992 births
Living people
Dragons RFC players
Munster Rugby players
Rugby union centres
Rugby union players from Pietermaritzburg
Rugby union wings
South Africa Under-20 international rugby union players
South African people of British descent
South African rugby union players
Western Province (rugby union) players
Alumni of Michaelhouse